The All-Ireland Senior Hurling Championship 1905 was the 19th series of the All-Ireland Senior Hurling Championship, Ireland's premier hurling knock-out competition.  Kilkenny won the championship, beating Cork 7-7 to 2-9 in a replay of the final.

Format

All-Ireland Championship

Quarter-finals: (3 matches) These are two lone quarter-finals involving the Leinster and Ulster representatives and Glasgow and Lancashire.  The provincial champions are on one side of the draw.  Two teams are eliminated at this stage while the two winning teams advance to the All-Ireland semi-final.

Semi-finals: (2 matches) The winners of the two quarter-finals join the Munster and Connacht representatives to make up the semi-final pairings.  Two teams are eliminated at this stage while the two winning teams advance to the All-Ireland final.

Final: (1 match) The winners of the two semi-finals contest this game with the winners being declared All-Ireland champions.

Results

Connacht Senior Hurling Championship

Leinster Senior Hurling Championship

Munster Senior Hurling Championship

Ulster Senior Hurling Championship

All-Ireland Senior Hurling Championship

References

Sources

 Corry, Eoghan, The GAA Book of Lists (Hodder Headline Ireland, 2005).
 Donegan, Des, The Complete Handbook of Gaelic Games (DBA Publications Limited, 2005).

See also

1905